is a vertically scrolling shooter video game developed and published by Capcom in Japan in 1984 and released in North America by SNK the same year. The game was Capcom's first video game. The game is included in Capcom Classics Collection and is available as freeware.

A Nintendo Entertainment System sequel was developed but never released. However, a playable finished ROM has surfaced online since its cancellation.

Gameplay
The player controls a spaceship with a single objective: destroy incoming enemies. The vessel has two different weapons: a primary weapon with infinite ammunition and a limited supply of bombs. By picking up the "Pow" icons, which sporadically appear throughout the levels, the player can replenish supplies. Similar to Xevious, the game does not have distinct levels; the background alternates between the surface of a planet and a space field. The game repeats with increased difficulty until the player loses all of their lives.

Reception
According to Game Machine, Vulgus was among the most popular arcade games in Japan during June 1984.

In Play Meter magazine, Roger C. Sharpe gave it a generally favorable review and rated it three hashes.

Legacy
A follow-up game, Titan Warriors, originally known as Neo Vulgus, was in development for the Nintendo Entertainment System, but went unreleased. In 2001, Capcom released Vulgus as freeware for IBM PCs and PDAs. Vulgus is available in the compilation title Capcom Generation 3 for the Sony PlayStation and Saturn. The game was also included in the 2005 Capcom Classics Collection for the Sony PlayStation 2 and Microsoft's Xbox, in Capcom Classics Collection Reloaded for the PlayStation Portable and as a bonus game at Capcom Arcade Cabinet.

The Pow icon is re-used in many other Capcom games, like 1941: Counter Attack, Bionic Commando and Exed Exes. Likewise, the Yashichi enemy has made later appearances in many Capcom games, usually in a more benign role as a power-up. Valgas, a boss character from the Power Stone series, has his name based on this game.

In Marvel vs. Capcom 3: Fate of Two Worlds, Deadpool reveals that he is petitioning for Capcom to make Vulgus 2.

Notes

References

External links
 

1984 video games
Arcade video games
Cancelled Nintendo Entertainment System games
Capcom games
Freeware games
Vertically scrolling shooters
Video games developed in Japan
Windows games
PlayStation Network games
Xbox 360 Live Arcade games